Kamiakin's Gardens were the first place to be irrigated in the Yakima River valley in central Washington state. Chief Kamiakin (1800–1877) was a leader of the Yakama Nation who sought to avoid conflict with European settlers and missionaries who started arriving in the region in the 1840s. Kamiakin directed that a ditch be excavated to nourish a plot near Ahtanum Creek, hoping to provide a sedentary existence for his people that would keep them out of conflict with the settlers. Crops included squash, corn and potatoes, fed by what became known to settlers as Kamiakin's Ditch. In 1851 a Catholic mission was established near the creek.

Kamiakin's initiative to avoid conflict with the settlers proved fruitless, and Kamiakin became a leader during the Yakima War of the 1850s.

Kamiakin's Gardens were placed on the National Register of Historic Places on December 22, 1976.

References

Parks on the National Register of Historic Places in Washington (state)
Geography of Yakima County, Washington
Native American history of Washington (state)
National Register of Historic Places in Yakima County, Washington�